Chalagera (also Chalagere) is a village in Koppal district, Karnataka, India.

References

Villages in Koppal district